Adi Hasak is a screenwriter, producer, and former journalist  He is the creator of the American crime drama series, Shades of Blue, which stars Jennifer Lopez, Ray Liotta, and Drea de Matteo. The series premiered of January 7, 2016 on NBC.

Early life
Hasak was born in Rotterdam, Netherlands. After a stint in the military, he worked as a journalist.

Career
He co-wrote the 1997 film, The Shadow Conspiracy. It was the final film directed by George P. Cosmatos, who died in 2005. Hasak is a frequent collaborator with Luc Besson, and the pair have jointly written and produced two feature films, From Paris With Love, starring John Travolta, and 3 Days To Kill, starring Kevin Costner. 

He developed the drama series Eyewitness, which is based on the Norwegian series Øyevitne, for American television. It premiered on USA Network on October 16, 2016 and lasted one series.

Hasak developed, wrote and acted as showrunner on The Box (Swedish TV series), which premiered on Viaplay on 28 November 2021.

References

External links

Movieweb.com Interview with Adi Hasak
 

Living people
American television writers
American male television writers
Year of birth missing (living people)